Richard Evans (January 23, 1935 – October 2, 2021) was an American film and television actor. He guest starred in numerous television series such as  Wagon Train, Alfred Hitchcock Presents, Sea Hunt, Cheyenne, The Rifleman,  Bonanza,The Fugitive, Perry Mason, Gunsmoke, The Iron Horse, The Men from Shiloh, Star Trek (episode, "Patterns of Force"), and The High Chaparral.

On April 15, 1962, Evans was cast as a young cutthroat, Billy Deal, in the episode "Sunday" of the ABC-WB western series, Lawman. He also was in a 1969 Lassie episode, "No Margin for Error" (Season 16).

Evans also played secondary roles in several B-films.

Evans is best remembered for his portrayal of college English professor Paul Hanley in the ABC soap opera Peyton Place, a role which he played in 1965. 

He died from cancer on October 2, 2021, at the age of 86.

Filmography

References

External links

1935 births
2021 deaths
American male film actors
American male television actors
Male actors from Los Angeles
Western (genre) television actors